Clifford is an unincorporated community in Lincoln, Oneida, and Price counties, Wisconsin, United States. Clifford is located in the towns of Somo in Lincoln County, Lynne in Oneida County, and Knox in Price County.

References

Unincorporated communities in Lincoln County, Wisconsin
Unincorporated communities in Oneida County, Wisconsin
Unincorporated communities in Price County, Wisconsin
Unincorporated communities in Wisconsin